The 2018 PFF National Challenge Cup was the 27th edition of domestic cup competition in Pakistan. 24 teams participated in the competition, from 21 April to 10 May 2018. The Pakistan National Challenge Cup was held in Karachi after FIFA lifted it ban. The matches took place at the KPT Stadium and the All Brothers Football Stadium, Malir.

The tournament took place after a gap of two years due to a power struggle within the Pakistan Football Federation. The Federation was being run by a court-appointed administrator, whose appointment was declared unlawful by a division bench of the High Court which ordered financial and administrative control to be handed over to the legitimate body headed by Syed Faisal Saleh Hayat. FIFA also lifted the ban imposed on PFF after the legitimate body was restored by the court ruling.

The tournament coincided with the appointment of José Antonio Nogueira as head coach of the Pakistan national football team on 16 April 2018. Nogueira reached Karachi on 26 April to witness the event first-hand.

Teams
The 24 teams participating in the tournament are as below:

Group stage

Group A

Group B

Group C

Group D

Group E

Group F

Group G

Group H

Knockout round

Quarter-finals

Semi-finals

Third position

Finals

Bracket

Top scorers

References

External links
 2018 National Challenge Cup GSA

Pakistan National Football Challenge Cup
Football competitions in Pakistan
Pakistan
2018 Asian domestic association football cups
2018 in Pakistani sport
Sport in Karachi
April 2018 sports events in Pakistan
2010s in Pakistan
2010s in Karachi